Simon Smith (November 14, 1839 – November 7, 1924) was a member of the Wisconsin State Assembly.

Biography
Smith was born on November 14, 1839 in Axbridge, England. He settled in Beloit, Wisconsin in 1856. During the American Civil War, he served with the 15th Illinois Volunteer Infantry Regiment of the Union Army.

He died in Beloit on November 7, 1924.

Political career
Smith was a member of the Assembly during the 1907, 1909 and 1911 sessions. Previously, he had been Mayor of Beloit from 1899 to 1904. Additionally, Smith was a member of the county board of Rock County, Wisconsin and went on to be its Chairman. He was a Republican.

References

People from Axbridge
English emigrants to the United States
Politicians from Beloit, Wisconsin
Republican Party members of the Wisconsin State Assembly
Mayors of places in Wisconsin
People of Wisconsin in the American Civil War
Union Army soldiers
1839 births
1924 deaths